The Ministry of Finance was a cabinet ministry of the government of Rhodesia. It was responsible for overseeing the nation's public finances.

The Ministry of Finance was established during the colonial period of Southern Rhodesia, first as the office of Tresurer in 1923. The office was renamed as Minister of Treasury from June 1954 to April 1964. The office retained the same structure when Rhodesia unilaterally declared independence in 1965.

Ministers of Finance before UDI 
Percival Donald Leslie Fynn, July 1933 - September 1933
Jacob Hendrik Smit, September 1933 - 1942
Percival Donald Leslie Fynn, January 1935 – April 1937, acting
William Sydney Senior, April 1937 – July 1939, acting
Ernest Lucas Guest, July 1939 – December 1941, acting
Godfrey Martin Huggins, December 1941 - February 1942
Max Danziger, February 1942 - December 1942
Godfrey Martin Huggins, December 1942 – June 1945, acting
Leslie Benjamin Fereday, June 1945 – May 1946, acting
Ernest Lucas Guest, May 1946 - September 1946
Godfrey Martin Huggins, September 1946, acting
Edgar Cuthbert Fremantle Whitehead, September 1946 - March 1947
Ernest Lucas Guest, March 1947 - November 1947, acting
Patrick Bissett Fletcher, November 1947 – August 1949, acting
Godfrey Martin Huggins, August 1949 – September 1950, acting
Patrick Bissett Fletcher, September 1950 – June 1951, acting
Godfrey Martin Huggins, June 1951 – January 1952, acting
Patrick Bissett Fletcher, January 1952 - April 1952, acting
John Moore Caldicott, April 1952 – January 1953, acting
George Arthur Davenport, January 1953 - September 1953, acting
Donald MacIntyre, September 1953 - December 1953
Reginald Stephen Garfield Todd, December 1953 - February 1954
Cyril James Hatty, June 1954 - December 1954, Minister of Treasury
George Arthur Davenport, December 1954 – August 1955, acting Minister of Treasury
Patrick Bissett Fletcher, August 1955 – December 1956, acting Minister of Treasury
Reginald Stephen Garfield Todd, December 1956 – October 1957, acting Minister of Treasury
Geoffrey Ellman Brown, October 1957 – January 1958, acting Minister of Treasury
Abraham Eliezer Abrahamson, January 1958 - February 1958, Minister of Treasury
Cyril James Hatty, February 1958 - August 1959, Minister of Treasury
Edgar Cuthbert Fremantle Whitehead, August 1959 – September 1962, acting Minister of Treasury
Geoffrey Ellman Brown, September 1962 - December 1962, Minister of Treasury
Ian Douglas Smith, December 1962 - October 1963, Minister of Treasury
William John Harper, October 1963 – April 1964, acting Minister of Treasury
John Wrathall, April 1964 − November 1965
Source:

Ministers of Finance after UDI 
John Wrathall, November 1965 − January 1976
David Colville Smith, January 1976 − June 1979
Ernest Bulle, April 1978 – June 1979

Ministers of Finance of Rhodesia and Nyasaland
Donald MacIntyre, 1953-1962
John Moore Caldicott, 1962-1963
Source:

References 

Rhodesia
History of Rhodesia
Finance
Rhodesia, Minister of Finance
Rhodesia, Ministry of Finance
Finance
Finance
1933 establishments in Southern Rhodesia
1965 establishments in Rhodesia
Finance